Maryland Public Interest Research Group (MaryPIRG) is a student activist non-profit organization and one of many State PIRGs. The organization works on a variety of local activist activities, including environmental activism, textbook trading on college campuses, democratic reforms, control of antibiotics in food products, and help for the homeless. They also provide internships and work study jobs for students at the University of Maryland.

MaryPIRG's University of Maryland, College Park Chapter has been active since 1973. During this time, the organization has served as a channel for students to seek social change while acquiring leadership and organizing skills. Each semester, members propose and vote on the campaigns that the organization will pursue.

In addition to the student chapter, MaryPIRG also has a full office in both Baltimore and Washington, D.C.

Campaigns

Save the Bay 
MaryPIRG's current environmental campaign "Save the Bay" focuses on a variety of issues. In 2016-2017, the group petitioned and lobbied members of the Maryland General Assembly in support of a state-wide ban on Hydraulic fracturing, commonly known as "fracking". During the 2017-2018 school year, the campaign focused on  implementing a state-wide ban on expanded polystyrene foam food service products, known commonly as "Styrofoam". This ban would include products such as polystyrene foam carry-out containers and carry-out cups which have many substitutes including traditional plastics, cardboard, and paper.

Democracy 
The Democracy campaign focuses primarily on expanding voter access and diminishing the effect of special interest money in elections. The campaign has largely focused its efforts on passing state and local legislation that create Publicly funded elections programs. The campaign has also focused on Automatic Voter Registration and Election Day Registration.

The Democracy campaign also works to register students to vote in their New Voters Project (NVP). The project entails setting up tables on the University of Maryland, College Park campus where individuals can register to vote ahead of primary or general elections.

Textbook Affordability 
The Textbooks campaign addresses the issue of the high costs of required college textbooks. The campaign is attempted to establish a textbook exchange program where the books can be matched and traded. It has since shift its focus to raise awareness and increase adoption of Open Source textbooks and Open Educational Resources (OER). The campaign has also focused its efforts on Pell Grant programs for textbooks.

Antibiotics 
The Antibiotics campaign focuses on the overuse of antibiotics. The campaign aims to "save antibiotics" by educating the public about them and working with businesses to reduce their overuse.

Hunger and Homelessness 
The Hunger and Homelessness campaign aims to prevent hunger in Maryland and to provide aid to homeless individuals. The campaign has raised money from University of Maryland students to provide homeless shelters with hygienic products and food.

Past Campaigns 

 Save the Bees 
 Toxins

Achievements

Since 2016 

 Contributed to state-wide fracking ban in Maryland 
 Secured $5 million from Congress for an Open Textbook Pilot program that will save students an estimated $50 million in textbook costs 
 Persuaded Subway (restaurant), McDonald's, and KFC to stop selling meat raised with the routine use of antibiotics in order to protect life-saving drugs 
 Registered 3,500 students to vote in 2016 elections 
 Small donor matching program in Howard County, Maryland 
 Small donor matching program in Montgomery County, Maryland 
 Helped prevent a proposed $2.6 billion cut to Pell Grant funding  
 Helped raise thousands of dollars for those impacted by Hurricane Maria 
 Contributed to passage of Pollinator Protection Act in Maryland 

Public Interest Research Groups
Government watchdog groups in the United States
Public Interest Research Group
Political advocacy groups in the United States
University of Maryland, College Park research projects
University of Maryland, College Park student organizations